The Yugantar Ashram was the building in San Francisco, California, US that housed the headquarters of the Ghadar Party, the liberation movement of India during rule by Great Britain. First headquarters was at 436 Hill St, San Francisco, California. Ghadar Party operated from there from 1913 to 1917. It housed a printing machine which published Ghadar a newspaper from here. In 1917, headquarters of Ghadar Party were shifted to 5 Wood Street, San Francisco, which is the present site of Ghadar Memorial. The Ashram building with historical records was handed over to Government of India in 1949. On a move from the local community since 1952 to setup a memorial, the Government of India sanctioned US$83,000 for restoration of dilapidated building. Ground breaking for restoration work was done by Indian Minister of External Affairs, S. Swaran Singh in September 1974. Ghadar Memorial was inaugurated in 1975 by TN Kaul, Indian ambassador to US. A memorial establishing a historical museum and library has been built there.

There are 21 framed pictures of the Gadar Party leaders and martyrs on two opposite walls of the main hall. Twenty-two open bookshelves have an assortment of books and four showcases display some Gadar Party material.

Newspaper of Yugantar Ashram
Yugantar Circular was also name of weekly newspaper  started by Har Dayal, secretary of Ghadr Party which was later named Ghadr as per decision taken in an Oregon meeting at Finnish Socialist Hall in Astoria Oregon for starting and opening the headquarters of Ghadr party in San Francisco and starting newspaper Ghadr with Sohan Singh Bhakna as President

External Link
 Gadar Memorial Hall page on the website of the Consulate General of India, San Francisco.

References

Ghadar Party
Revolutionary movement for Indian independence
Indian independence movement